Rudolf Fehrmann (22 June 1886 – 1947), a German, was a pioneer rock climber at Elbsandsteingebirge near Dresden.

Climbing career
He began climbing at the age of 17 and was soon at the leading edge of the fledgling sport. He and Oliver Perry-Smith, an American college student and fellow climber living in Dresden, became as close as brothers and formed a team which pushed the limits of risk and difficulty on the steep sandstone spires, making many first ascents.  Early on, Fehrmann exerted leadership in both climbing ethics and environmental protection. He imagined the purest of climbing routes as "great lines", ascending directly up steep faces and cracks and sometimes presenting considerable difficulties, and he encouraged the use of rope-soled slippers and a minimum of metal protective devices in order to avoid destroying the fragile rock.

In 1903, Fehrmann began climbing on the Schrammsteine rocks. Before long, he became one of the best mountain climbers in Saxon Switzerland and ascended a number of important climbing peaks. Among his 'firsts' were, in 1904, the Chinesische Turm (Alter Weg, Saxon grade V), in 1905, the Barbarine (grade VI), the Höllenhund (grade V(VIIa)) and the Schwedenturm (grade V). Among his other firsts, were the Fehrmannweg route (VIIa) on the Mönch in 1904 and the Südriss (VIIb) on the Dreifingerturm in the Schrammsteine in 1906.

Fehrmann also climbed in the Alps and Dolomites, as well, creating new routes there. In 1908, he published a climbing guide for the sandstone spires near Dresden, his favorite area, entitled "Der Bergsteiger in der Sächsischen Schweiz". Fehrmann joined the NSDAP in its early stages, and became a Party functionary. As a lawyer, he served during World War II as a military judge. He was able, during this time, to work out accessibility issues regarding the rocks along the Elbe, assisting the climbing community. He was captured at the end of the war and interned in an East German war prisoner camp, where he died a natural death at the age of 61 in 1947.

See also
 Oliver Perry-Smith
 History of rock climbing

References

Literature 
 Thorington, J. Monroe (1964). "Oliver Perry Smith: Profile of a Mountaineer", American Alpine Journal
 A. Goldhammer & M. Wachtler (1936). "Bergsteigen in Sachsen", Dresden
 www.gipfelbuch.de

External links
 German Climbing Site
 Climbing History Site

German rock climbers
1886 births
1947 deaths